Andrej Brčák (born 17 August 1984 in Trstená) is a Slovak football striker who currently plays for FK Nižná nad Oravou.

References

External links
 SFZ profile
 ÖFB profile
 Corgoň Liga profile
 Šport.sk profile
 Eurofotbal profile
 

Slovak footballers
Association football forwards
Slovak Super Liga players
MFK Dolný Kubín players
FC ViOn Zlaté Moravce players
MFK Tatran Liptovský Mikuláš players
ŠK Senec players
People from Trstená
Sportspeople from the Žilina Region
1984 births
Living people